This is a list of episodes for the television series Treasury Men in Action, a.k.a. Federal Men.

Series overview

Episodes
 Ep = Episode number by season
 № = Overall episode number

Season 1: 1950–51

* The title of this episode is unknown.

Season 2: 1951–52

Season 3: 1952–53

Season 4: 1953–54

* The title of this episode is unknown.

Season 5: 1954–55

Sources
 

Treasury Men in Action